Grace & Mercy is the second album and the debut live album by Marvin Sapp. The album was recorded live in December 1996 at Bethel Pentecostal Abundant Life Center. It peaked at number 11 on the Billboard Album charts.

Track listing

Chart positions

Personnel

Band
Richard Gibbs - Organ
Al Willis - Guitars
Raymond Bady - Drums
Steve Huff - Bass
Rodney East - Piano

Background Vocals
Roosevelt Agnew, Diane Alexander, Tyrone Block, Sheila Cutts, Renee Flowers, Malique Grear, Eleanor Hampton, Charlotte Horton, Michael Hudson, Donyle Jones, Norman McPherson, Desmond Pringle, Phyllis Russell, Henry Sapp, Meri Thomas, Orlando Wright, Ted Wright

References

1997 albums
Marvin Sapp albums